W43A or IRAS 18450-0148 is a late-type star with an envelope of OH/IR type with a magnetically collimated jet (a protoplanetary nebula). The star is in the early stages of becoming a planetary nebula, a process that will take several thousand years.

References

Further reading 
 
 
 
 

Aquila (constellation)
Asymptotic-giant-branch stars
IRAS catalogue objects